The 2015–16 Philippine Basketball Association (PBA) Philippine Cup Finals was the best-of-7 championship series of the 2015–16 PBA Philippine Cup, and the conclusion of the conference's playoffs. The Alaska Aces and the San Miguel Beermen competed for the 38th All-Filipino championship and the 116th overall championship contested by the league.

This also serves as the rematch for both teams, as they competed for the 2014–15 Philippine Cup and for the 2015 Governors' Cup, a year and a conference, respectively.

The Alaska Aces won the first three games to go up 3–0, behind Vic Manuel's outstanding performances. Since then, the San Miguel Beermen won Games 4, 5, and 6 to force a Game 7 and became the first team in PBA history to force a seventh game, after being down 0–3, behind excellent performances from Marcio Lassiter and Arwind Santos. Game 5 marked the return of June Mar Fajardo, who suffered a knee injury in Game 6 of their semifinals series against the Rain or Shine Elasto Painters.

San Miguel won against Alaska in seven games to capture their 22nd PBA championship and their 6th Philippine Cup. Dubbed as "BEERacle", San Miguel became the first team in professional basketball history to win a series coming from a 0–3 deficit.

Background
In the 2015–16 PBA Philippine Cup, the Alaska Aces and the San Miguel Beermen were the top 2 teams in the conference, both with a 9–2 record. In their head-to-head matchup in the elimination round, the Aces defeated San Miguel, 103–97 to clinch the top spot in the elimination round. The Beermen finished second. With the virtue of being the top two teams, the Aces and the Beermen qualified directly to the semi-finals of the conference.

In the semi-finals, Alaska faced the GlobalPort Batang Pier, who are making their first semi-finals appearance in the history of their franchise. The first game was won by GlobalPort, led by Terrence Romeo's career high 41 points. Since then, the Aces bounced back to win 4 straight games to win the series 4–1 with the held, and make their 10th Philippine Cup Finals appearance.

San Miguel faced the Rain or Shine Elasto Painters in the other semi-final series. The two teams last played a semifinals series against each other during the 2015 PBA Governors' Cup. The first game was won by San Miguel, coming back from a 20-point deficit, behind June Mar Fajardo's double-double of 36 points and 18 rebounds and Ronald Tubid's outside shooting heroics. Rain or Shine won Game 2, led by Jeff Chan's 16 points, and Game 3, led by Paul Lee's 18 points. The Elasto Painters were not able to win the next games and the Beermen went on to win 3 straight games to win the series 4–2 and to book their ticket to the finals. However, June Mar Fajardo got injured with a twisted left knee during the game and was brought out of the Smart Araneta Coliseum, and was brought directly to the St. Lukes Medical Center in Taguig.

Road to the finals

head-to-head matchup

Series summary
*overtime

Game 1

In this game, the Beermen and the Aces were tied after the first quarter as both team scored 23 points a piece. Then at halftime, the Beermen hold a 4-point lead against the Aces. After the third quarter, the Beermen scored 33 points as they got a nine-point lead over the Aces. But in the 4th quarter, the Aces scored 34 points to comeback from a nine-point deficit in the 3rd quarter and won Game 1 of the series.

Game 2

Game 3

Game 4

Game 5

Game 6

Game 7

In a controversial move, Alaska head coach Alex Compton called for three straight timeouts at the start of the game.

By winning the game and the series, San Miguel became the first team in professional basketball history to comeback in a 3–0 deficit.

Rosters

{| class="toccolours" style="font-size: 95%; width: 100%;"
|-
! colspan="2" style="background-color: #; color: #; text-align: center;" | Alaska Aces 2015–16 PBA Philippine Cup roster
|- style="background-color:#; color: #; text-align: center;"
! Players !! Coaches
|-
| valign="top" |
{| class="sortable" style="background:transparent; margin:0px; width:100%;"
! Pos. !! # !! POB !! Name !! Height !! Weight !! !! College
|-

  also serves as Alaska's board governor.

{| class="toccolours" style="font-size: 95%; width: 100%;"
|-
! colspan="2" style="background-color: #; color: #; text-align: center;" | San Miguel Beermen 2015–16 PBA Philippine Cup roster
|- style="background-color:#; color: #; text-align: center;"
! Players !! Coaches
|-
| valign="top" |
{| class="sortable" style="background:transparent; margin:0px; width:100%;"
! Pos. !! # !! POB !! Name !! Height !! Weight !! !! College
|-

Broadcast notes
The Philippine Cup Finals aired on TV5 with simulcasts on Hyper (both in standard and high definition) and Cignal TV channel 198 (in high definition). TV5's radio arm, Radyo5 aired it as well. Fox Sports Asia airs the games as well on a delayed basis.

Cignal TV provided English-language coverage of the Finals.

Additional Game 7 crew:
Trophy presentation: James Velasquez
Dugout celebration interviewer: Mara Aquino

References

External links
PBA official website

2016
2015–16 PBA season
San Miguel Beermen games
Alaska Aces (PBA) games
PBA Philippine Cup Finals
PBA Philippine Cup Finals